Dirt Sense is the second studio album by South African recording artist Ashton Nyte, frontman for the Gothic Rock band The Awakening.  Described as "stripped down, minimalist, under-produced, almost dirty", and "a powerful album with strong tunes and hard-hitting lyrics"  the album contains some of the artist's "most personal" songs.  A video was produced for the single Window and aired throughout South African music television.

In 2005 Dirt Sense was re-released as a second edition, remixed and mastered with a bonus CD featuring, among others, Nyte's interpretation of Elvis's "Fever."

Track listing

 Conclusion
 Sick Of This
 Valentine
 Stained
 Eloquent Verbosity
 Automation
 Clean Again
 Window
 Down
 The Other Band
 New Messiah Of The Week
 Splinters
 Consequence

(Bonus CD – b-sides and out-takes)
1 Plastic Industry
2 Fever
3 Trite
4 The Summer The Sun Ignored

References

2002 albums